"All the Kings" is a single by British indie rock band, Editors. The song is the sixth and final single from the band's fifth studio album, In Dream. It is also the eighth track on the album. The single was released on 16 June 2016 through PIAS Recordings.

Music video 
Rahi Rezvani, who directed the previous singles on In Dream also directed the music video for "All the Kings". The music video was recorded in the Dutch Spaarnwoude Park between Amsterdam and IJmuiden (at climbing wall / landArt) and released on 16 June 2016. Leo Sigh described the song as "powerful, heart-grabbing Editors track that comes with a gorgeous video".

Charts

References

External links
 

2015 songs
2016 singles
Editors (band) songs
PIAS Recordings singles
Music videos directed by Rahi Rezvani
Songs written by Edward Lay
Songs written by Russell Leetch
Songs written by Tom Smith (musician)
Songs written by Justin Lockey
Songs written by Elliott Williams